Moulay Abdallah is a town in El Jadida Province, Casablanca-Settat, Morocco. According to the 2004 census it has a population of 6,482.Every year in summer, the town holds the Mawsim of Moulay Abdallah Amghar.

References

Populated places in El Jadida Province
Rural communes of Casablanca-Settat